Niilo Paasivirta is a Finnish Internet personality, who has become known for the Internet writings that parody fundamentalist Christian views. In Finland, he's best known for the essays called "Oikeat Mielipiteet" ("Correct Opinions"), and elsewhere for the "Love Thy Neighbor" and Game of Satan pages, that parody moral panic in role-playing games, as well as his Foreigner's Guide to Finland page. The pages were written at the time when the moral panic was being discussed, and first in mid-1990s, and the humorous approach was both disapproved of, and later, as the moral panic waned, approved of.

In several occasions, Paasivirta has said his date of birth is September 3, 1956, which is debatable, as the same interview also had wild claims about his "roots in nobility" and "special skills".

Game of Satan 

Game of Satan pages parody the anti-role-playing game movement. According to the pages, the role-playing games are anti-Christian, sinful, make the players worship Satan, practice (among other things) occultism,  religions other than Christianity, paraphilias, turn them into members of sexual minorities, commit crimes and go to Hell. Paasivirta himself described the page as follows:

The Game of Satan pages have gained some cult following. Many people have understood the joke, and supported the page for that reason, but some have thought the page was a real opinion of a "conservative Christian" and mocked people who had the same kind of views. It has been seen as one of the examples of Poe's law.

Correct Opinions 

Paasivirta writes essays called "Oikeat Mielipiteet", or "Correct Opinions", to mock conservative views. Their length varies, they're typically related to current matters, and take point of view which is exaggeratedly conservative, right-wing, pro-military, patriotic and racist, in vein of the similar conservative groups in United States. In addition to the Usenet and Paasivirta's own home page, the essays have been published on a web page called Bittivuoto.net, and a computer magazine called Enter.

Blasphemy accusations 

In 1999, Paasivirta was investigated by police for allegedly violating Finnish blasphemy laws for the material published on his web page in the end of 1998. The prosecutor noted Paasivirta had posted blasphemous material and publicly agitated others to commit such crimes, but charges were not filed because the blasphemy was no longer treated as a criminal matter.

In the material, Paasivirta briefly and without any elaboration called God a "bull calf drone", "ectoplasm", "pickle being roasted in pig lard", "pedophile", "drug addict" and "career criminal". The page also had a phone number for police tip line and admitted to violating blasphemy laws. Later, he claimed he was referring to the invisible pink unicorn rather than the Christian God. The material is no longer available on Paasivirta's home page.

References 

 Ilkka Mäyrä, 26.4.1998, ITK'98-alustus: Verkko kulttuurikasvattajana – vai kulttuurinen kasvu verkossa?

External links 
 Home Page of Niilo Paasivirta
 Newsgroup (Googlen Groups)
 Guestbook of np
 Valtiotorni, "The Only True Blog"
 Niilopedia. The True Encyclopedia.
 Bittivuoto.net, Petri Muhonen 07.01.2004, Interview
 Blasphemy case
 Keskisuomalainen, 25.1.1999, Internet-Jumalanpilkasta ei nosteta syytettä
 Päätös syyttämättä jättämisestä jumalanpilkasta 15.1.1999
 Discussion in Usenet

This article contains material from corresponding Finnish Wikipedia article Niilo Paasivirta, as of November 15, 2010, 13.46.''

Finnish bloggers
Finnish parodists
Living people
Finnish Internet celebrities
Year of birth missing (living people)